Otto Blom (19 March 1887 – 22 July 1972) was a Dutch tennis player. He competed for the Netherlands in the tennis event at the 1912 Summer Olympics where he took part in the men's singles competition. He lost in the first round to the Swede Carl Setterwall in three straight sets.

He won the singles title at the Dutch Tennis Championships in 1909, 1910 and 1911. At the same tournament he won the doubles title in 1909 and 1912 and the mixed doubles title in 1906 and 1911.

Blom participated in the Wimbledon Championships in 1909 and 1910. In 1909 he lost in the first round of the singles event to George Coulson and also lost in the first round of the doubles event. In 1910 he reached the fourth round in the singles event in which he lost to Arthur Lowe. In the doubles event he partnered Sirdar Nihal Sing and reached the second round.

References

External links
 
 

1887 births
1972 deaths
Dutch male tennis players
Olympic tennis players of the Netherlands
Tennis players at the 1912 Summer Olympics
Tennis players from Amsterdam